Rebecca Eckler is a Canadian writer of columns and blogs about motherhood, and is author of two books on the same subject, Knocked Up: Confessions of a Hip Mother-to-Be (2004), and Wiped! Life with a Pint-Sized Dictator, (2007). As of 2016, she has authored five further, the latest of which is The Mommy Mob: Inside the Outrageous World of Mommy Blogging (2014).

Career

As columnist and blogger 

Eckler was employed by the National Post from 2000 to 2005, when she was among a number of staff let go by the CanWest newspaper chain.

From March–December 2006, Eckler wrote "Mommy Blogger", a weekly freelance piece in The Globe and Mail, appending to this set of blogs a departing blog in May 2007. From 2003 until April 2008 she wrote Post City's Shopgirl column.

Eckler began writing bloc post appearing periodically in the Canadian periodical, Maclean's, in 2008, which has continued through 2016.

Eckler's work also appeared in Mademoiselle.

Eckler was the host of the short-lived television show Modern Manners, and has appeared on CTV and CBC television. She has also worked for Global television as a reporter.

As book author
Eckler became pregnant with her daughter, Rowan Joely, on the night of her engagement party, and published the 2004 book Knocked Up: Confessions of a Hip Mother-to-Be about her first pregnancy. The book received mostly negative reviews.

In April 2007, Eckler publisher her second book, Wiped! Life with a Pint-Sized Dictator, which chronicles her first two years of motherhood. Quill & Quire said the book was a "series of tired clichés about parenthood." Wiped! has otherwise received negative reviews in Canadian dailies.

Eckler published Blissfully Blended Bullshit with Dundurn Press in 2019, on managing life with a blended family.

Controversies

Eckler's writing has elicited controversy. For instance, there was international coverage of the responses to her blogging about her decision to leave her 10-month old infant to join her fiancé for the duration of a celebrity golf tournament in Mexico. Responses to her book and blog content have frequently included assessments of writing from privilege, shallowness and immaturity, and self-justification of non-traditional decisions.

Eckler's blog, NinePoundDictator, prompted the creation of a parody blog, NineGramBrain, which was noted in The Toronto Star, a site that appeared until December 2007.

In mid-2007, Eckler filed a lawsuit against Universal Studios, alleging copyright infringement for similarities between her book and the 2007 comedy film Knocked Up. Judd Apatow, the movie's producer and director, said the book and movie were "very different." As of this date, the lawsuit had not settled.

Personal life
Eckler's home was referenced in the April 2007 edition of Canadian House and Home.

In 2007, Eckler participated in a charity auction for the magazine The Walrus, paying $7,000 for the right to have a character in Margaret Atwood's novel The Year of the Flood named after her.

References

Further reading

External links
NinePoundDictator - Author's blog

Canadian columnists
Canadian women non-fiction writers
Jewish women writers
Canadian newspaper journalists
Living people
1973 births
Canadian women journalists
The Globe and Mail columnists
Canadian women columnists
Jewish Canadian journalists